Carmine T. Guida is a New York City-based, nationally recognized musician, teacher and performer. He is also a programmer and creator of online games and apps.

Music
Guida is known primarily for teaching the doumbek, however also plays several other instruments professionally: oud, cumbus, riq, bass guitar, guitar and mandolin. He appears on the Beginners Guide To Bellydance [Box set] released by UK label Nascente, and is described by ethnomusicologist Eric Bernard Ederer as a well-known Cumbus player alongside Steve Vai.

Guida was voted favorite musician in the New Jersey Belly Dancing Peoples' Choice awards. His performances on doumbek have also been favorably reviewed. Jareeda magazine said of his drumming on a Pangia CD (on which he provided all of the drum solos) "Pangia CDs have ... killer drums solos...". His production, as well as musicianship of the Turkish Band Camp All-Stars CD, was also praised

He has also appeared in the movie Mixed Signals.

History

Guida was a computer scientist who was CEO of web page development company Team5, when he decided that his time was better spent as a full-time musician.

Carmine's first instrument was the Bass Guitar. He was inspired by groups like Rush and entertained audiences with his slap bass stylings, which were made popular by groups like Primus. Carmine started performing in front of live audiences at his local Church, St. Rose of Lima in Massapequa New York.

Performer
Carmine T. Guida has had hundreds of performances inside and outside of the US. He performs in New York City with Middle East meets Brooklyn fusion band Djinn. Their debut album, "The Middle East Side", was favorably reviewed by The Chronicles. Guida has also performed with New York City-based progressive rock band Pain Hertz. Carmine also performs monthly on Long Island with traditional bellydance music band Baharat.

Releases

Partial discography

Videography/Filmography

Music licensing
Music by Paige23
   Ed - NBC TV
   Medium - NBC TV

Music by Carmine Guida
  Back to the Beginning - ABC TV

Music by Djinn
  Secrets of the Sistine - ABC TV
  Adventures of an Incurable Optimist - ABC TV
   Gothic Bellydance Revelations - World Dance New York DVD
   Sensual Bellydance - World Dance New York DVD
   Belly Dance With Jim Boz - Jim Boz CD
   No Reservations (Istanbul episodes) - Travel Channel
   Back to the Beginning - ABC TV

Music from Shake Em Up
   Pop, Lock and Shimmy - Cheeky Girls Productions DVD
   Killer Ziller - Cheeky Girls Productions DVD

Music from Pangia
   American Belly Dance Legends - Amaya Productions DVD

Music from Dorku
   Music of Turkey: Cultural Crossroads - Carnegie Hall Instructional sheet music/CD

Games and Apps
Guida has created apps and games for Apple and Android and is developing a game for the OUYA console. Guida is developing his multi-player space game Quintet for OUYA in response to requests by backers of a fundraising campaign that supported his development for Android. Guida has also developed a free Unity3D tool Dreamlo, which allows users to store and access data on an online database using HTTP requests.

References

Year of birth missing (living people)
Living people
Musicians from New York City
Indie video game developers